The Assembly of Manitoba Chiefs (AMC; preceded by the Manitoba Indian Brotherhood) is an association that advocates on issues affecting First Nations in Manitoba. Representing 62 of the 63 First Nations in the province, it advocates on behalf of over 151,000 First Nation citizens in Manitoba.

The Grand Chief is Cathy Merrick of Cross Lake.

History
Preceding the Assembly of Manitoba Chiefs was the Manitoba Indian Brotherhood (MIB; later renamed the Assembly of Manitoba Chiefs), which was created in the late 1960s as a province-wide body to provide a common voice for First Nations in Manitoba.

The MIB presented their landmark position paper—entitled, "Wahbung: Our Tomorrows"—in opposition to then-Prime Minister Pierre Elliott Trudeau's 1969 White Paper which proposed the abolition of the Indian Act. The federal government at the time argued that the Indian Act was discriminatory and that the special legal relationship between Aboriginal peoples and the Canadian state should be dismantled in favour of equality, in accordance with Trudeau's vision of a "just society". The federal government proposed that by eliminating "Indian" as a distinct legal status, the resulting equality among all Canadians would help resolve the problems faced by Indigenous peoples. After opposition from many Indigenous leaders—including the MIB—the white paper was abandoned in 1970. The MIB paper was presented to Trudeau and the Government of Canada in 1971.

The body would dissolve by the early 1980s due to the difficulties of an increasingly elaborate agenda and emerging regional interests. An "All Chiefs Unity Assembly" eventually convened in 1987 to adopt by consensus a statement of principles of political unity. That year, Louis Stevenson was appointed as the first Provincial Leader for the Assembly of Manitoba Chiefs. In 1988, the Chiefs-in-Assembly formulated a model for province-wide political cooperation among the First Nations, thereby establishing the basic structure and mandate for the Assembly of Manitoba Chiefs and its secretariat.

In 1990, the title of Provincial Leader for the Assembly of Manitoba Chiefs was changed to Grand Chief of the Assembly of Manitoba Chiefs. In September 1994, the AMC adopted its constitution.

Leaders

Mandated organizations
The mandated organizations of AMC include:

 Manitoba First Nations Education Resource Centre (MFNERC), established in 1998
 Treaty Relations Commission of Manitoba (TRCM), opened in 2005
 First Peoples Economic Growth Fund, established in 2005
 First Peoples Development Inc. (FPDI), established in 2012
 First Nations Health and Social Secretariat of Manitoba, established in 2013

See also

 Anishinaabe tribal political organizations

References

Notes

External links

Constitution of the Assembly of Manitoba Chiefs

First Nations in Manitoba
First Nations organizations